Rihanna: Live in Concert Tour was the debut concert tour by Barbadian recording artist Rihanna. Taking place during the summer of 2006, the tour supported both her debut studio album Music of the Sun and her second studio album A Girl like Me and traveled across North America. During the final leg in North America, Rihanna served as the opening act for the Black Eyed Peas' Monkey Business Tour.

Opening acts 
 Field Mob (select dates)
 Jeannie Ortega (select dates)
 J-Status (select dates)

Setlist
 "Pon de Replay"
 "If It's Lovin' that You Want"
 "You Don't Love Me (No, No, No)"
 "Crazy Little Thing Called Love" / "Here I Go Again"
 "We Ride"
 "Break It Off"
 "Unfaithful"
 "Let Me"
 "Kisses Don't Lie"
 "That La, La, La"
 "P.S. (I'm Still Not Over You)"
 "Redemption Song"
 "A Girl like Me"
 "SOS"

Performed at select dates where rapper J-Status was a part of the opening act.

Tour dates 

Festivals and other miscellaneous performances
This concert was a part of the "Cisco Systems Blues Festival"
This concert was a part of Z103.5's 14th Annual Pizza Pizza Summer Rush
This concert was a part of WKSE's "Kiss the Summer Hello"
This concert was a part of "Reggae Sumfest"
This concert was a part "Toms River Fest"
This concert was a part of the "Jackson County Fair"
This concert was a part of the International de montgolfières de Saint-Jean-sur-Richelieu
This concert was a part of the "End of Summer Concert Series"
This concert was a part of "Lawnparties"
This concert was a part of "Mixfest"

References

External links 
 

Rihanna concert tours
2006 concert tours